A Night Like This is a 1932 comedy film directed by Tom Walls and starring Walls, Ralph Lynn and Winifred Shotter. Ben Travers wrote the screenplay, adapting his own play, the original 1930 Aldwych farce of the same title.

The film was made at British and Dominion's Elstree Studios with sets designed by the art director Lawrence P. Williams.

Plot
Police Constable Mahoney, with the help of the affable Clifford Tope, outwits a criminal gang that operates from a gambling club. Mahoney and Tope restore a stolen necklace to its owner.

Cast
 Ralph Lynn as Clifford Tope*
Tom Walls as PC Michael Mahoney*
Winifred Shotter as Cora Mellish*
Mary Brough as Mrs Decent*
Robertson Hare as Miles Tuckett*
Claude Hulbert as Aubrey Slott  
C. V. France as Micky the Mailer  
Joan Brierley as Molly Dean  
 Boris Ranevsky as Koski  
Reginald Purdell as Waiter 
Norma Varden as Mrs Tuckett*
Kay Hammond as Mimi, cocktail shaker  
 Hal Gordon as Taxi driver  
 Roy Fox's Band as Night club band 
 Al Bowlly as Singer   
Lew Stone as Pianist  

Source: British Film Institute
Cast members marked * were the creators of the roles in the original stage production; Michael Mahoney was called Michael Marsden in the stage play.

References

External links
A Night Like This at IMDB

1932 films
1932 comedy films
Aldwych farce
Films set in London
British comedy films
British films based on plays
Films directed by Tom Walls
Films set in England
British black-and-white films
British and Dominions Studios films
Films shot at Imperial Studios, Elstree
1930s English-language films
1930s British films